Angostura Reservoir is a reservoir on the Cheyenne River in Fall River County, South Dakota, United States. It was created after the construction of Angostura Dam in 1949 for irrigation by the U.S. Bureau of Reclamation. "Angostura" means "narrows" in Spanish.

The Angostura Recreation Area surrounds the lake and is a popular location for boating, swimming, camping, and fishing. The lake supports populations of walleye, northern pike, smallmouth bass, and sunfish. As one of the only large bodies of water in the area, Angostura Reservoir is also an important location for migratory birds.

See also
 List of lakes in South Dakota
 U.S. Bureau of Reclamation
 Cold Brook Lake
 Cottonwood Springs Lake

External links
 Angostura Recreation Area - South Dakota Department of Game, Fish, and Parks 
 Angostura Reservoir - U.S. Bureau of Reclamation

References

Reservoirs in South Dakota
Protected areas of Fall River County, South Dakota
Bodies of water of Fall River County, South Dakota
Lakes of South Dakota